Department of Architecture may refer to:

 Department of Architecture, University of Cambridge
 Department of Architecture (Bangladesh)
 Department of Architecture, Universiti Teknologi Malaysia

See also
 School of Architecture, Oxford Brookes University
 MIT School of Architecture and Planning